Freelancers is an American comedy web television series created by Mallory Everton for JK! Studios. Shot in Provo, Utah, the first season premiered on YouTube on March 28, 2019, and concluded after eight episodes on May 23, 2019. In December 2020, an investment campaign was launched to produce a second season; its $1 million target was reached the following January. The eight-episode second season premiered on the Angel Studios app on November 4, 2021.

Synopsis

Cast and characters
 Whitney Call as Arizona "Zona" Goodwin, the creator and producer of the video production company, Video Production Company
 Mallory Everton as Devin Mann, the editor for Video Production Company
 Stacey Harkey as Micah Pratchett, the light, sound, and make-up artist for Video Production Company
 Stephen Meek as Owen Darby, the director for Video Production Company
 Matt Meese as Ryan Mcloud, the camera operator for Video Production Company

Additional cast members include Natalie Madsen as Joan, James Perry as Frank Butts, Jason Gray as Little Harry and the Jaded Clown, Tori Pence as Miriam, Adam Berg as Mr. Doyle, and Jeremy Warner as Mr. Nightmare. Jeffrey Lee Blake has a recurring role as Mr. Gandolfini, the group's weird neighbor, and Ruth Clarke makes an appearance as Ryan's grandma.

Episodes

Series overview

Season 1 (2019)

Special (2019)

Season 2 (2021)

Production

Created by Mallory Everton, Freelancers was one of the first projects started by JK! Studios, following their departure from the BYUtv sketch comedy series Studio C and appearance on NBC's Bring the Funny. The first season of the series was written in six weeks, by four writers who had never worked on "sitcom material" before. In a statement, actress and writer Whitney Call said, "It was pretty scary to leave the security of BYUtv and pursue our dream of creating unlimited, family accessible comedy together. To see what our content means to the amazing people out there shows us that this is bigger than us. We want people to join us and feel at home while watching our shows."

The show is filmed entirely in the state of Utah. For the series' main location, the crew rented an old home in Provo, with additional filming taking place on-location. The first season of Freelancers was produced and budgeted using Patreon, allowing fans of the show to donate to JK! Studios. Various cast members of the series also wrote episodes for the show, including Adam Berg, Mallory Everton, and Matt Meese.

In December 2020, an investment campaign was launched by JK! Studios to produce a second season for Angel Studios. The company reached their $1 million goal in January 2021, promising to make eight episodes in return. In April, the Utah Film Commission announced that the second season had been given permission to film in Utah County along with two other projects, estimating that the productions would generate approximately $1.9 million in economic impact. Filming for the second season concluded in May 2021.

Release
The show's first season premiered on March 28, 2019, and concluded after eight episodes on May 23. A Christmas special was later released on December 19, 2019. As of November 2021, the first season has garnered an estimated 7 million viewers on YouTube. A second season premiered on November 4, 2021.

References

External links
 

2010s American workplace comedy television series
2020s American workplace comedy television series
2019 American television series debuts
American comedy television series
English-language television shows
Television shows filmed in Utah